Brett Sonne (born May 16, 1989) is a Canadian former professional ice hockey centre.  He is a former prospect of the St. Louis Blues organization, having been selected by the Blues in the third round, 85th overall, in the 2007 NHL Entry Draft.  He is the 2009 recipient of the Four Broncos Memorial Trophy as WHL player of the year.  Sonne was a member of the gold medal winning Canadian team at the 2009 World Junior Ice Hockey Championships

Playing career
Sonne began his major junior career with the Calgary Hitmen of the WHL in 2004–05, playing in six games as a 15-year-old.  After a 21-point rookie campaign in 2005–06, he scored 21 goals the next season and was subsequently drafted 85th overall in the 2007 NHL Entry Draft by the St. Louis Blues.  A strong start in the 2007–08 season was derailed when he suffered a broken ankle in November 2007 that caused him to miss the majority of the regular season.  He emerged as a top player in the WHL, finishing third in league scoring in 2008–09 with 100 points 62 games.  He was named to the WHL East First All-Star Team, along with teammates Paul Postma and Brandon Kozun, and won the Four Broncos Memorial Trophy as WHL player of the year, beating out Western Conference nominee and Bob Clarke Trophy-winner Casey Pierro-Zabotel of the Vancouver Giants.

Sonne's dedication to improving his overall game as well as his leadership abilities earned him a spot with the Canadian junior team at the 2009 World Junior Ice Hockey Championships. He recorded one goal and two assists in six games, as Canada won its fifth consecutive gold medal at the tournament.

On April 9, 2013, Sonne was traded from the Texas Stars to the Peoria Rivermen for defenseman Carl Sneep. Both players are considered to be loaned and remain property of their respective clubs.

After four seasons within the Blues organization, Sonne was released as a free agent and signed a one-year contract with Austrian club Dornbirner EC of the EBEL on July 30, 2013.

Career statistics

Regular season and playoffs

International

Awards and honours

References

External links

1989 births
HC '05 Banská Bystrica players
Calgary Hitmen players
Canadian ice hockey centres
SG Cortina players
Dornbirn Bulldogs players
Evansville IceMen players
Frisk Asker Ishockey players
Ice hockey people from British Columbia
Living people
Mora IK players
People from Chilliwack
Peoria Rivermen (AHL) players
St. Louis Blues draft picks
Texas Stars players
Canadian expatriate ice hockey players in Austria
Canadian expatriate ice hockey players in Slovakia
Canadian expatriate ice hockey players in Norway
Canadian expatriate ice hockey players in Italy
Canadian expatriate ice hockey players in Sweden
Canadian expatriate ice hockey players in the United States
Canadian expatriate ice hockey players in Denmark
Canadian expatriate ice hockey players in France
Ducs d'Angers players
Herlev Eagles players